Sabatini may refer to:

People 
 Sabatini (surname)

Places 
 Sabatini Gardens in Madrid, Spain
 Sabatini, Italy, a volcanic region in Italy

See also 
 Sabbatini, a family name of Italian origin
 Sabadini